La Chaux-de-Fonds railway station serves the municipality of La Chaux-de-Fonds, in the canton of Neuchâtel, Switzerland.

Opened in 1857, the station is owned and operated by SBB-CFF-FFS.  It forms the junction between three SBB-CFF-FFS standard gauge lines: from Morteau in France (via Le Locle-Col des Roches), from Neuchâtel and from Biel/Bienne.

The station also offers interchange with two metre gauge lines: the Chemins de fer du Jura (CJ) line to Glovelier and the Transports publics Neuchâtelois line to Les Ponts-de-Martel.

History
This railway was constructed by the Compagnie du Jura industriel, to link the watchmaking industry in the Watch valley of the Neuchâtel Jura with the cantonal capital of Neuchâtel.

Location
La Chaux-de-Fonds railway station is situated at Place de la Gare, right in the centre of the city.

Services 
The following services stop at La Chaux-de-Fonds:

 RegioExpress/Regio:
 Regio:

See also

History of rail transport in Switzerland
Rail transport in Switzerland

References

External links
 
 

Railway stations in the canton of Neuchâtel
Swiss Federal Railways stations
La Chaux-de-Fonds
Railway stations in Switzerland opened in 1857